Tom Sewell (born March 11, 1962) is a retired American professional basketball player. He played in the National Basketball Association (NBA) for the Washington Bullets during the 1984–85 season.

Biography
Born in Pensacola, Florida and a graduate of Booker T. Washington High School, Sewell played collegiately with the Cardinals of Lamar University for three years, averaging 22.9 points per game as a junior.

Sewell was selected by the Philadelphia 76ers with the 22nd overall pick in the 1984 NBA draft. The 76ers, eager to offer a long-term deal to Charles Barkley (whom they had selected with the #5 pick they had previously obtained from the San Diego/Los Angeles Clippers) immediately traded Sewell to the Washington Bullets for a 1988 pick (which was later traded back to the Bullets who used it to select Harvey Grant).

Sewell played one season for the Bullets, recording 20 points, 6 assists, 4 rebounds, 3 steals, and 1 block over 21 games.

He now coaches the school basketball team Ark Putney in London, England and referees the u14 and u16 basketball games.

References

External links
 

1962 births
Living people
African-American basketball players
Amarillo Badgers men's basketball players
American expatriate basketball people in Greece
American expatriate basketball people in the Netherlands
American men's basketball players
Basketball players from Florida
Detroit Spirits players
Donar (basketball club) players
Grand Rapids Hoops players
Lamar Cardinals basketball players
Panathinaikos B.C. players
Philadelphia 76ers draft picks
Shooting guards
Sportspeople from Pensacola, Florida
Washington Bullets players
Wyoming Wildcatters players
21st-century African-American people
20th-century African-American sportspeople